Pseudhippopsis is a genus of beetles in the family Cerambycidae, containing the following species:

 Pseudhippopsis albescens Breuning, 1940
 Pseudhippopsis albolateralis Breuning, 1940
 Pseudhippopsis allardi Breuning, 1958
 Pseudhippopsis brunneipes Aurivillius, 1914
 Pseudhippopsis filicornis Gestro, 1895 
 Pseudhippopsis filiformis (Olivier, 1795)
 Pseudhippopsis gracilis (Fahraeus, 1872)
 Pseudhippopsis ituriensis Breuning, 1971
 Pseudhippopsis latifrons Breuning, 1940

References

Agapanthiini